A lexical set is a group of words that all share a particular phonological feature.

A phoneme is a basic unit of sound in a language that can distinguish one word from another. Most commonly, following the work of phonetician John C. Wells, a lexical set is a class of words in a language that all share a certain vowel phoneme. As Wells himself says, lexical sets "enable one to refer concisely to large groups of words which tend to share the same vowel, and to the vowel which they share". For instance, the pronunciation of the vowel in cup, luck, sun, blood, glove, and tough may vary in different English dialects, but is usually consistent within each dialect, and so this category of words forms a lexical set: what Wells, for ease, calls the  set. Meanwhile, words like bid, cliff, limb, miss, etc. form a separate lexical set: Wells's  set. Originally, Wells developed 24 such labels—keywords—for the vowel lexical sets of English, which have been sometimes modified and expanded by himself or other scholars for various reasons. Lexical sets have also been used to describe the vowels of other languages, such as French, Irish and Scots.

There are several reasons why lexical sets are useful. Scholars of phonetics often use abstract symbols (most universally today, those of the International Phonetic Alphabet) to transcribe phonemes, though they may follow different transcribing conventions or rely on implicit assumptions in their exact choice of symbols. One convenience of lexical sets is their tendency to avoid these conventions or assumptions. Instead, Wells explains, they "make use of keywords intended to be unmistakable no matter what accent one says them in". This makes them useful for examining phonemes within an accent, comparing and contrasting different accents, and capturing how phonemes may be differently distributed based on accent.

Standard lexical sets for English 
The standard lexical sets for English introduced by John C. Wells in his 1982 Accents of English are in wide usage. Wells defined each lexical set on the basis of the pronunciation of words in two reference accents, which he calls RP and GenAm.

 "RP" refers to Received Pronunciation, the traditionally prestigious accent in England.
 "GenAm" refers to an accent of the General American type, which is associated with a geographically "neutral" or widespread sound system throughout the US.

Wells classifies English words into 24 lexical sets on the basis of the pronunciation of the vowel of their stressed syllable in the two reference accents. Typed in small caps, each lexical set is named after a representative keyword. Wells also describes three sets of words based on word-final unstressed vowels, which, though not included in the standard 24 lexical sets (the final three sets listed in the chart below) "have indexical and diagnostic value in distinguishing accents".

It therefore belongs in the  lexical set.

Some English words do not belong to any lexical set.

The notation  for happ has since emerged and been taken up by major pronouncing dictionaries, including Wells's, to take note of this shift. Wells's model of General American is also conservative in that it lacks the cot–caught (–) and horse–hoarse (–) mergers.

Choice of the keywords
Wells explains his choice of keywords ("kit", "fleece", etc.) as follows:

The keywords have been chosen in such a way that clarity is maximized: whatever accent of English they are spoken in, they can hardly be mistaken for other words. Although fleece is not the commonest of words, it cannot be mistaken for a word with some other vowel; whereas beat, say, if we had chosen it instead, would have been subject to the drawback that one man's pronunciation of beat may sound like another's pronunciation of bait or bit.

Wherever possible, the keywords end in a voiceless alveolar or dental consonant.

Usage
The standard lexical sets of Wells are widely used to discuss the phonological and phonetic systems of different accents of English in a clear and concise manner. Although based solely on RP and GenAm, the standard lexical sets have proven useful in describing many other accents of English. This is true because, in many dialects, the words in all or most of the sets are pronounced with similar or identical stressed vowels. Wells himself uses the Lexical Sets most prominently to give "tables of lexical incidence" for all the various accents he discusses in his work. For example, here is the table of lexical incidence he gives for Newfoundland English:

: 
: 
: 
: 
: 
: 
: 
: 
: 

: 
: 
: 
: 
: 
: 
: 
: 
: 

: 
: 
: 
: 
: 
: 
happ: 
lett: 
comm: 

Lexical sets may also be used to describe splits and mergers. For example, RP, along with most other non-rhotic accents, pronounces words such as "father" and "farther" identically. Most North American accents make "father" rhyme with "bother".

Origin
In a 2010 blog post, Wells wrote:

He also wrote that he claimed no copyright in the standard lexical sets, and that everyone was "free to make whatever use of them they wish".

Extensions
Some varieties of English make distinctions in stressed vowels that are not captured by the 24 lexical sets. For example, some Irish and Scottish accents that have not undergone the fern–fir–fur merger split the  lexical set into multiple subsets. For such accents, the 24 Wells lexical sets may be inadequate. Because of this, a work devoted to Irish English may split the Wells  set into two subsets, a new, smaller  set and a  set.

Some writers on English accents have introduced a  set to refer to a set of words that have the  vowel in standard accents but may have a different vowel in Sheffield or in south-east London. Wells has stated that he didn't include a  set because this should be interpreted as an allophone of  that is sensitive to the morpheme boundary, which he illustrates by comparing the London pronunciations of goalie and slowly.

, which documents the phonologies of varieties of English around the world like , employs Wells's standard lexical sets as well as the following supplementary lexical sets, as needed to illustrate finer details of the variety under discussion:
, discussed above
hors, offics, paintd and villge, all referring to the unstressed allophone of  that is subject to the weak vowel merger
treac and unc, both referring to the vocalized 
Other supplementary lexical sets include:
There is also the  set, which is the same as Wellsian .

See also 
 Diaphoneme
 Homophone
 Minimal pair

References

Bibliography

External links 
 Nicole Taylor (with the collaboration of Norma Mendoza-Denton ), The University of Arizona, Anthropology 383, Standard Lexical Sets, 2002 (in Archive.is)
 University of Pennsylvania, Linguistics 001, Lecture 9: Pronunciation of English

Phonology
English phonology

Linguistics terminology